Jean Sulivan, pseudonym of Joseph Lemarchand, was a French priest and writer (born 30 October 1913 in Montauban (now Montauban-de-Bretagne), in Ille-et-Vilaine; died 16 February 1980 in Boulogne-Billancourt (Hauts-de-Seine)).

Works

Late 1950s 
1958: Le Voyage intérieur, Plon
1959: L'insurrection du prince
1959: Provocation ou la faiblesse de Dieu

1960s 
1960: Le bonheur des rebelles, Plon
1960: Le Prince et le mal, Paris, Spes
1961: Ligne de crête Plon
1962: Paradoxe et scandale, Plon
1962: Du côté de l'ombre, Éditions Gallimard
1964: Mais il y a la mer, Gallimard
1965: Le plus petit abîme, Gallimard
1966: Devance tout adieu, Gallimard, Prix des écrivains de l'Ouest (1988)
1966: Car je t'aime, ô Éternité !, Gallimard
1967: L'Obsession de Delphes, Gallimard
1968: Bonheur des rebelles, Gallimard
1968: Consolation de la Nuit, Gallimard
1968: Dieu au-delà de Dieu, Gallimard, series "Les Essais"
1969: Les Mots à la gorge, Gallimard
1969: Miroir brisé, Gallimard

1970s 
1970: D'Amour et de mort à Mogador, Gallimard
1971: Petite littérature individuelle followed by Logique de l'écrivain chrétien, Gallimard, series "Voies ouvertes" directed by Jean Sulivan
1974: Joie errante, Gallimard
1975: Je veux battre le tambour, Gallimard
1976: Matinales I : Itinéraire spirituel, Gallimard, Prix Bretagne (1976) Morning Light: The Spiritual Journal of Jean Sulivan
1979: "La Dévotion moderne", introduction to L'imitation de Jésus-Christ, nouvelle traduction du latin par Michel Billon, Desclée de Brouwer, series "Connivence"
1978: L'instant l'éternité, conversations with Bernard Feillet, Éditions du Centurion
1979: Quelque temps de la vie de Jude et Cie, Stock

1980s and later 
1980: L'Exode, 
1980:Parole du passant, Le Centurion-Panorama Aujourd'hui, Paris
___
1981: L'Écart et l'alliance, Gallimard
1986: Bloc-notes, preface by Jacques de Bourbon Busset, éditions SOS du Secours catholique
1994:Une lumière noire, about Hubert Beuve-Méry, Paris, éditions Arléa

Jean Sulivan's archives 
At the beginning of 2011, Jean Sulivan's archives were deposited by Édith Delos, legatee of Jean Sulivan, at the Institut mémoires de l'édition contemporaine.

Bibliography and documents

Anthologies 
1996: Pages, édition de Marie Botturi, Edith Delos, Marguerite Genzbittel, Gallimard
2006: Jean Sulivan. Libre sous le regard de Dieu, presentation by Patrick Gormally and Mary Ann Mannion, Fides, Quebec
2003: L'incessante marche. Extraits de Jean Sulivan, selection by Joseph and Maryvonne Thomas, Mine de Rien, Néant-sur-Ivel
2010: Jean Sulivan Abécédaire, edition established and presented by Charles Austin, Gallimard

À propos Jean Sulivan 
« Jean Sulivan », mentioned in chapter "Roman et idéologies d'après-guerre. 2.:Orthodoxies et création" in Littérature XXe siècle - Textes et documents, Collection Henri Mitterand, Éditions Nathan, revised and updated edition - printing in February 2001, . 
Henri Guillemin, Sulivan ou la Parole libératrice followed by Passez les passants by Jean Sulivan, Gallimard, 1977.
 « Le sacrement de l'instant. Présence de Jean Sulivan », Question de, n°80
Rencontres avec Jean Sulivan, Revue de l'Association des Amis de Jean Sulivan, directrice de publication : Édith Delos, directeur de rédaction: Claude Goure
Claude Lebrun, Invitation à Jean Sulivan, Éditions du Cerf, 1981.
 , Jean Sulivan, je vous écris, Éditions Desclée de Brouwer, 2000 
 Collective,  (dir.), Jean Sulivan, L'écriture insurgée, Éditions Apogée, Rennes, 2007
 Eamon Maher, Jean Sulivan, 1913-1980 : la marginalité dans la vie et l'œuvre, L'Harmattan, 2008.
Franck Delorme, "La parole vive de Jean Sulivan", in Études - revue de culture contemporaine, March 2010. 
 Jean Sulivan, une parole d'intériorité pour aujourd'hui, Acts of the symposium in Ploërmel 24 and 25 April 2010, Les Sources et les Livres, 2, rue de la Fontaine, 44410 Assérac.
 Jean Lavoué, Jean Sulivan, la voie nue de l'intériorité,  Éditions Golias, Lyon, 2011.
 , « Jean Sulivan, contemporain » - sur Jean Sulivan  Abécédaire by Charles Austin (November 2010), La Croix, 6 January 2011.

Audio-visual documentation 
 La flûte de Jean Sulivan, film by Patrick Chagnard, broadcast on TF1 18 February 1968, and « La parole inachevée », interview of Jean Sulivan by Marie-Thérèse Maltèse, broadcast on TF1 24 September 1978 - Association des amis de Jean Sulivan, Les Films du Parotier et CFRT, 2006 (DVD).

Bibliography 
 Updated bibliography in "Appendices" of Jean Sulivan Abécédaire, edition established and presented by Charles Austin, Gallimard, November 2010 .

External links 
 Jean Sulivan, contemporain on La Croix (5 January 2011)
 Jean Sulivan on Babelio
 L’Exode de Sulivan : une parole d’intériorité pour aujourd’hui on Culture et Foi
  Littérature et spiritualité : l'aventure de Jean Sulivan (article by Pádraig Ó Gormaile) on Persée

1913 births
People from Ille-et-Vilaine
1980 deaths
20th-century French non-fiction writers
Writers from Brittany
Poets from Brittany
20th-century French Roman Catholic priests
French Roman Catholic writers